Third Floor Gallery was an independent charitable photography gallery in Cardiff Bay, Wales. It opened in 2010 and predominantly featured documentary photography, often premiering new work with the direct involvement of the photographers. It closed in 2016.

Third Floor Gallery was set up and initially run by its founding trustees, photographers Maciej Dakowicz and Joni Karanka, and later photographer Bartosz Nowickii, with help from volunteers. It continued to be self-run with volunteer staff and was self-financed through various grassroots sources. It was noted for its use of social networking for engaging with visitors and volunteers at a time when that was not common place for galleries.

Notable photographers that exhibited at Third Floor Gallery include Martin Parr, David Hurn, Tom Wood, Chris Steele-Perkins, Larry Fink, Mark Cohen, John Bulmer, Rob Hornstra, Simon Roberts, Peter Dench, Ewen Spencer, Ken Grant and Vanessa Winship.

Description
In January 2010 founding trustees photographers Maciej Dakowicz and Joni Karanka invested £1000 each to cover a quarter of the lease and the service charges for a loft in Bute Street, Cardiff Bay. Third Floor Gallery opened on 12 February 2010 with an exhibition by Peter Dench. From the beginning volunteers helped sustain the gallery with donations of money, and with help hanging exhibitions and staffing. Within the first year of operation, Bartosz Nowicki joined as third trustee and they received charitable status.

The gallery continued to be self-run and self-financed. Rather than being grant funded, it was financed through a variety of grassroots sources: financial donations from visitors; some of those involved in running it auctioned off their own photographs; donations were solicited via requests through social networking services; and the photographer whose exhibition was showing donated an object from or related to that exhibition that was auctioned off.

It was noted for its use of social networking for engaging with visitors and volunteers at a time when that was not common place for galleries.

In March 2012 the gallery expanded to a second floor with an additional gallery, digital darkroom, and dedicated space for community usage. It closed in 2016.

Awards
2011 Epic Award (Wales) from Voluntary Arts Network (VAN), for the best voluntary arts groups in the UK and Ireland

Exhibitions
13 February – 7 March 2010 – LoveUK by Peter Dench.
12 March – 4 April 2010 – Up West by David Solomons.
10 April – 16 May 2010 – Muse by Jocelyn Bain Hogg.
21 May – 6 June 2010 – ffotoCardiff group exhibition by Jocelyn Allen, Gawain Barnard, Craig Bernard, Rick Davis, Malika Delrieu, Paul Gaffney, Rob Gunn, Radoslaw Komenda, Kate Mercer, Bartosz Nowicki, Gareth Phillips, Chiara Tocci, James Thomson, Rob Watkins and Rajan Zaveri.
11 June – 11 July 2010 – For Love of the Game by Chris Steele-Perkins.
17 July – 22 August 2010 – Paradise Rivers by Carolyn Drake.
28 August – 3 October 2010 – strangelands by strange.rs street photography collective.
10 October – 14 November 2010 – Street Photography Now.
19 November 2010 – 9 January 2011 – Passing Time by David Hurn.
15 January 2011 – 13 February 2011 – A Collection by Laura Pannack.
19 February 2011 – 20 March 2011 – Views from Sochi by Rob Hornstra.
26 March – 1 May 2011 – Mi Vida Loca by Joseph Rodriguez.
7 May – 12 June 2011 – The North by John Bulmer.
18 June – 24 July 2011 – The Gathering Clouds by Ben Roberts.
30 July – 4 September 2011 – Arab Revolutions.
10 September – 9 October 2011 – Of Duties by Stuart Griffiths, Jay Romano and Tim and Matt Bowditch.
15 October – 13 November 2011 – Selected Works by Sergey Chilikov.
19 November 2011 – 8 January 2012 – Behind the Curtains by Tomas van Houtryve.
13 January – 19 February 2012 – Larry Fink: Somewhere There's Music by Larry Fink.
25 February – 25 March 2012 – Touching Strangers by Richard Renaldi.
17 March 2012 – 6 May 2012 – V.D. by Vincent Delbrouck.
31 March 2012 – 6 May 2012 – Family by Chris Verene.
5 May 2012 – 17 June 2012 – The Last Resort by Martin Parr and Tom Wood.
12 May 2012 – 2 July 2012 – Caravan by Rikard Laving.
23 June 2012 – 12 August 2012 – Teenagers by Ewen Spencer.
14 July 2012 – 2 September 2012 – We English by Simon Roberts.
18 August 2012 – 7 October 2012 – Encuentro by Maurice Gunning.
15 September – 28 October 2012 – Burn My Eye by the Burn My Eye street photography collective, Zisis Kardianos, Charlie Kirk, Andrew Kochanowski, Alexandros Konstantinakis Karmis, Frédéric Le Mauff, TC Lin, JB Maher, Jason Penner, Justin Sainsbury, Jack Simon and Justin Vogel.
14 October – 2 December 2012 – Cardiff After Dark by Maciej Dakowicz.
3 November 2012 – 15 February 2013 – Winter in America by Justin Maxton and Erin Trieb.
8 December 2012 – 27 January 2013 Grim Street by Mark Cohen.
2 February 2013 – 17 March 2013 – After the Fall by Hin Chua.
24 March 2013 – 28 April 2013 – Life After Zog and Other Stories by Chiara Tocci.
5 May 2013 – 16 June 2013 – Urban Quilombo by Sebastian Liste.
22 June 2013 – 28 July 2013 – Georgia by Vanessa Winship.
26 July 2013 – 10 August 2013 – Muse By Jocelyn Bain Hogg.
10 August 2013 – 15 September 2013 – Pictures From the Real World by David Moore.
22 September 2013 – 20 October 2013 – Y Tir Newydd / The New Land by Gareth Phillips.
26 October 2013 – 1 December 2013 – Distant Horizons by Transit Collective, Alexa Brunet, Alexandra Frankewitz, Bastien Defives, David Richard, Nanda Gonzague, Yohanne Lamoulere, Helene Jayet. Part of Diffusion Festival 2013.
14 December 2013 – 26 January 2014 – Close to You by Jacob Aue Sobol.
3 May 2014 – 29 June 2014 – Shift: Ukraine in crisis. Photographs by Alexander Chekmenev, Maxim Dondyuk, Corentin Fohlen, Louisa Gouliamaki, Brendan Hoffman, Tom Jamieson, Marco Kesseler, Anastasia Taylor-Lind, Donald Weber and Emine Ziyatdinova.
5 July 2014 – 24 August 2014 – Flock by Ken Grant.
6 September 2014 – 5 October 2014 – Tableaux Vivant by Alexandra Boulat.
8 November 2014 – 14 December 2014 – Swell by Mateusz Sarello.
25 April 2015 – 17 May 2015 – Welsh Farming Community by Peter Jones.
1–31 October 2015 – Detroit-Unbroken Down by Dave Jordano. Part of Diffusion: Cardiff International Festival of Photography.
12 December 2015 – 6 March 2016 – The Apollo Archive.
18 June – 10 July 2016 – Europa.

References

External links
Third Floor Gallery web site – as archived at the Internet Archive, 7 March 2016
Third Floor Gallery on Vimeo
Professional Photographer magazine audio discussion about Third Floor Gallery opening

Photography museums and galleries in Wales
2010 establishments in Wales
2016 disestablishments in Wales
Art galleries established in 2010
Art galleries disestablished in 2016
Arts in Cardiff